Chi In-jin (born July 18, 1973, in Seoul) is a South Korean former professional boxer who competed from 1991 to 1996. He has held the WBC featherweight title twice between 2004 and 2007.

Career

Boxing
Chi made his debut as a professional boxer on November 20, 1991. After losing his pro debut, he went unbeaten in his next 24 bouts.  He challenged WBC Featherweight Title holder Erik Morales on July 28, 2001, but lost a unanimous decision.  On October 18, 2003, the brawling Chi got another shot at the vacant WBC featherweight title against Michael Brodie, but came up short of the title with a draw.  In the rematch the following year, he knocked out Brodie in the 7th round. After defending the title twice, he lost the belt to Takashi Koshimoto in 2006 via split decision.

Chi recaptured the WBC featherweight title with a unanimous decision over defending titlist Rodolfo López at the Chungmu Art Hall in Seoul, Korea, in December 2006. Scores were 117-111, 116-112 and 116-113. Koshimoto had been defeated by Lopez in his first defense, yielding the belt to Lopez before it was regained by Chi.

Kickboxing
On July 31, 2007, Chi announced he was vacating his WBC title. He will instead participate in K-1 kickboxing.

On February 24, 2008, Chi made his debut as a K-1 fighter on the K-1 Asia MAX 2008 in Seoul. He defeated Ryuji Kajiwara by 3-0 unanimous decision on the extra rounds.

Professional boxing record

Professional kickboxing record

See also
List of Korean boxers
List of world featherweight boxing champions

References

External links

 

|-

|-

1973 births
Living people
People from Seoul
Sportspeople from Seoul
South Korean male boxers
South Korean male kickboxers
Welterweight kickboxers
Featherweight boxers
World featherweight boxing champions
World Boxing Council champions